The Military Park station (formerly Broad Street station) is an underground station on the Newark City Subway Line of the Newark Light Rail.  The station is owned and service is operated by New Jersey Transit.  The station is located at the intersection of Raymond Boulevard, Park Place and Broad Street in Downtown Newark at Military Park.  The station was opened in 1935 as Broad Street station.  It was renamed on September 4, 2004, so only one station in the system would carry the name Broad Street when Downtown Newark's stations (Penn Station and Broad Street) were connected by the Newark Light Rail line. The station is decorated with beige tiles and colored tiles for borders, mosaics and street indicator signs.  This station is not wheelchair accessible, but the adjacent stations, Penn Station and Washington Street, are.

History
In 1910, the Public Service Corporation planned to build two subway lines meeting at Broad Street (now Military Park).  An additional north–south line would have connected Bridge Street to the north with Clinton Avenue near The Coast/Lincoln Park neighborhood near Lincoln Park.  The proposed second segment of the Newark-Elizabeth Rail Link (NERL) together with the first segment, the Newark Light Rail would service this area.  The existing Newark City Subway Line was built in the old Morris Canal bed with construction beginning in 1929 and service starting on the line on May 26, 1935.

Attractions
Military Park
New Jersey Historical Society
Aljira, a Center for Contemporary Art
Park Place Farmers Market
Trinity and St. Phillips Cathedral
East Coast Greenway (undeveloped)
Lenape Trail (unmarked)
shops and restaurants and hotels
 One Theater Square

Other attractions
These attractions are less than a half mile from Military Park station and not served by a closer station:
Prudential Center
Government Center:
Newark City Hall

Transfers
Connections are available to the following lines:
NJ Transit: 13, 27, 39, 40, 41, 42, 43, 59, 62, 65, 66, 67, 70, 71, 72, 73, 76, 78, 79 and 108
ONE Bus: 24, 44

References

External links

 Broad Street entrance from Google Maps Street View

Newark Light Rail stations
Railway stations in the United States opened in 1935
1935 establishments in New Jersey